Hany Eitouni is an American innovator and entrepreneur, and a cofounder of Berkeley, CA based Seeo, a company commercializing a novel battery technology utilizing solid polymers. In 2010 he was recognized by being listed in the MIT Technology Review's TR35 list.

References

External links 
 TR35 Profile
 Seeo website

Living people
Year of birth missing (living people)